The Europe Zone was one of the three regional zones of the 1986 Davis Cup.

A new Africa Zone was contested for the first time, which served as a qualifying round for the Europe Zone. Teams from 9 African nations competed for 2 places in the Europe Zone main draws, joining an additional 24 teams. The winner of each sub-zone was then promoted to the following year's World Group.

France defeated Austria in the Zone A final, and Israel defeated Switzerland in the Zone B final, resulting in both France and Israel being promoted to the 1987 World Group.

Participating nations

Africa Zone: 

Europe Zones:

Africa Zone

Draw

  and  qualified to the Europe Zone main draws.

Europe Zone A

Draw

First round

Turkey vs. Luxembourg

Egypt vs. Malta

Bulgaria vs. Cyprus

Portugal vs. Zimbabwe

Poland vs. Finland

Quarterfinals

Turkey vs. France

Bulgaria vs. Egypt

Austria vs. Portugal

Poland vs. Romania

Semifinals

France vs. Bulgaria

Austria vs. Romania

Final

France vs. Austria

Europe Zone B

Draw

First round

Greece vs. Syria

Nigeria vs. Norway

Ireland vs. Belgium

Quarterfinals

Monaco vs. Hungary

Switzerland vs. Greece

Nigeria vs. Netherlands

Israel vs. Belgium

Semifinals

Hungary vs. Switzerland

Netherlands vs. Israel

Final

Switzerland vs. Israel

References

External links
Davis Cup official website

Davis Cup Europe/Africa Zone
Europe Zone